Brian Regan may refer to:

Brian Regan (comedian) (born 1958), American stand-up comedian
Brian Regan (actor) (born 1957), British actor
Brian Patrick Regan (born 1962), American intelligence officer
Brian Regan (writer), American screenwriter